Selo stantsii Yumatovo (Yomataw stantsiyahı) is a rural locality (a selo) in Yumatovsky Selsoviet, Ufimsky District, Bashkortostan, Russia. The population was 688 as of 2010. There are 28 streets.

Geography 
Selo is located 32 km southwest of Ufa (the district's administrative centre) by road. Uptino is the nearest rural locality.

References 

Rural localities in Ufimsky District